This article displays the rosters for the participating teams at the 2016 FIBA Africa Under-18 Championship for Women.

















See also
 2015 FIBA Africa Under-16 Championship for Women squads

References

External links
Official website

FIBA Africa Under-18 Championship for Women squads
2016 in youth sport
FIBA
FIBA